Baber is an unincorporated community at the mouth of Limestone Creek along the Guyandotte River situated between the communities of Daisy and Big Creek in northern Logan County, West Virginia, United States. Baber is accessed by West Virginia Route 10 and CSX Railroad.

Unincorporated communities in Logan County, West Virginia
Unincorporated communities in West Virginia
Populated places on the Guyandotte River